George McKenzie (22 September 1900 – 5 April 1941) was a Scottish bantamweight professional boxer who competed in the 1920s. His brother James MacKenzie, a flyweight, won Olympic silver in 1924 in Paris. He was born in Leith.

Amateur career
McKenzie won the 1920 Amateur Boxing Association British bantamweight title, when boxing out of the United Scottish ABC. Later that year, he won a bronze medal in Boxing at the 1920 Summer Olympics losing against boxer Clarence Walker in the semi-finals.

Olympic results
Below is the record of George McKenzie, a British bantamweight boxer who competed at the 1920 Antwerp Olympics:

 Round of 16: bye
 Quarterfinal: defeated John Koss (Norway)
 Semifinal: lost to Clarence Walker (South Africa)
 Bronze Medal Bout: defeated Henri Hebrants (Belgium)

Pro career
He fought professionally from 1922 to 1929 and is credited with a record of 36 - 7 - 2.

See also
 List of British featherweight boxing champions

References

External links

1900 births
1941 deaths
Bantamweight boxers
Scottish male boxers
Olympic boxers of Great Britain
Boxers at the 1920 Summer Olympics
Olympic bronze medallists for Great Britain
People from Leith
Place of birth missing
Olympic medalists in boxing
Scottish Olympic medallists
Medalists at the 1920 Summer Olympics